Epicauta hirticornis is a beetle species from the family of oil beetles (Meloidae). The species was first scientifically described in 1880 by Haag-Rutenberg.

References

Beetles described in 1880
Meloidae